Bakerville is a populated place situated within the city of Bisbee in Cochise County, Arizona, United States.

References

Populated places in Cochise County, Arizona